Gossia is a genus of rainforest trees in the myrtle family first described as a genus in 2003. It is native to northeastern Australia (Queensland and New South Wales) as well as several islands of Papuasia and New Caledonia.

The name honours the conservation works of the former premier of Queensland, Wayne Goss.

species

References

 
Myrtaceae genera
Flora of New South Wales
Flora of Queensland
Flora of Papuasia
Australasian realm flora